The 2032 UEFA European Football Championship, commonly referred to as UEFA Euro 2032 or simply Euro 2032, will be the 19th UEFA European Championship, the quadrennial international football championship organised by UEFA for the senior men's national teams of its member associations. The tournament is scheduled to be played from June to July 2032. The host is expected to be chosen in September 2023, and the tournament could be expanded to 32 teams.

Bid process

Countries must submit a bid with ten stadiums, one of which must have 60,000 seats, one of which (preferably two) must have 50,000 seats, four of which must have 40,000 seats and three of which must have 30,000 seats.

Bidding timeline
The UEFA Executive Committee on 16 December 2021 announced the bidding process would be held in parallel with that of Euro 2028. Interested bidders can bid for either one of the tournaments. The bidding timeline is as follows:

17 December 2021: Applications formally invited
23 March 2022: Closing date for registering intention to bid
30 March 2022: Bid requirements made available to bidders
5 April 2022: Announcement of bidders
28 April 2022: Opening workshop for bidders
16 November 2022: Submission of preliminary bid dossier
12 April 2023: Submission of final bid dossier
September 2023: Bid presentation and announcement of host

Confirmed bids 
Three declarations of interest to host the tournament (one later deemed ineligible) were received by UEFA before the deadline of 23 March 2022.

 – In February 2019, Italian Football Federation President Gabriele Gravina told Sky Sport Italia that the federation was considering a bid. The bid was proposed again by Gravina some few days after Italy's win at Euro 2020. Italy previously hosted the tournament in 1968 and 1980, and four matches of the multi-national Euro 2020 played in Rome. In February 2022, the Italian federation announced it would bid for Euro 2032, instead of 2028, as it would allow more time to redevelop facilities. Also on 23 March, the Italian bid was officially confirmed. In November 2022 Italy presented the preliminary bid dossier with the eleven cities that should be involved in the organization: Rome, Milan, Naples, Turin, Palermo, Genoa, Bologna, Florence, Bari, Cagliari and Verona. 
 – The Turkish Football Federation declared its interest in hosting either Euro 2028 or Euro 2032.

Rejected bids
 – Russia also announced its bid on 23 March, despite the current bans by UEFA on the participation of Russian clubs and the Russian national team due to the country's invasion of Ukraine. On 2 May, UEFA declared the 2028 and 2032 bids as ineligible.

References

2032
Scheduled association football competitions
2032 in association football